The Ford I4 DOHC engine is a cast iron block 4-cylinder inline internal combustion engine with twin overhead camshafts, produced by the Ford Motor Company at Dagenham Engine Plant. It was initially available as a 2.0 litre 8-valve version, and later in 2.0 and 2.3 litre 16-valve versions from 1989 to the end of production of the MK2 Ford Galaxy in 2006. It powered various Ford models during this time, but was most well known in the rear-wheel drive "Twin Cam" variants of the Ford Sierra and Ford Scorpio. Despite being built for the company's larger RWD models, Ford also employed the engine in the front-wheel drive Galaxy and the Escort RS 2000 16v.

History
The engine was originally designed to replace the 2.0 L OHC Pinto engine, derivatives of which had powered most of Ford's four-cylinder rear-wheel drive cars since the early 1970s, and which was by that time lagging behind the competition in terms of power output, efficiency and refinement. Equipped with a newly designed cast aluminium alloy twin-cam cylinder head but still only 8 valves, and a "square"  bore and stroke, the new I4 was launched in the Ford Sierra and Scorpio, mated to either the also new all-synchromesh MT-75 5-speed manual transmission or the existing A4LD four-speed automatic. The engine received mixed reviews, being seen as an improvement over the Pinto, but not the leap forward one might have expected.

Transverse installation
Although front-wheel drive and already powered by a separate range of engines, the Escort received the next major incarnation of the I4. In 1990, the MkV Escort had been launched to disappointing press reviews, and Ford were looking to boost the image of this critically important range and steal sales from arch rivals Vauxhall and VW who were doing very well with big bore GTE/GTI badged versions of their family hatches.

Ford's strategy was to introduce two high-performance versions of the Escort to compete in the hot hatch market, using the well known XR3i and RS2000 badges. The Zetec engine being developed for the new Mondeo was a still a year away, so rather than wait for the new engine to become available Ford opted to use this engine with a new multivalve cylinder head and tubular exhaust manifold, and mount it transversely in a FWD application.

With the discontinuation of the Sierra in 1993 and the RS2000 in 1996, the I4 engine continued in more workaday applications, appearing in the Ford Galaxy MPV launched in 1995. By this time, a longer-stroked 2.3 litre 16-valve version of the engine was available alongside the original 2.0 which was still available in both 8-valve and 16-valve versions. This 2.3 litre unit also appeared in the Ford Scorpio and the Ford Transit van. The I4 remained the main petrol unit for the original Galaxy until its 2006 redesign.

8v engine Specifications
 Two valves per cylinder with hydraulic valve lifters
 Twin camshafts driving by a timing chain
 Stroke and bore were both 
 Compression was 10.3:1 (Later versions of the 8V DOHC were 9.8:1)
 Five main crankshaft bearings

N8A
 Carbureted
 Power:  at 5600 rpm.
 Torque:  at 3000 rpm.
 Redline: 6050 rpm

N9A
 Electronic fuel injection (Batched multi-point)
 Power:  at 5500 rpm.
 Torque:  at 2500 rpm.
 Redline: 5950 rpm

N9C/N9E/NSE/N9D
 Electronic fuel injection (Batched multi-point) (N9x with EEC4, NSx with EEC5 [distributor-less])
 Catalytic converter
 Power:  at 5500 rpm
 Torque:  at 2500 rpm.
 Redline: 5950 rpm

16-valve engines

N7A 
 Capacity: 
 Bore x Stroke: 
 Compression: 10.3:1
 Valvegear: Chain driven DOHC. 16 valves. Hydraulic tappets.
 Fuelling: EEC-IV controlled multi-point fuel injection
 Power:  @ 6000 rpm
 Torque:  @ 4500 rpm

N3A
 Capacity: 
 Bore x Stroke: 
 Compression: 9.8:1
 Valvegear: Chain driven DOHC. 16 valves. Hydraulic tappets.
 Fuelling: EEC-V controlled multi-point fuel injection
 Power:  @ 6300 rpm
 Torque:  @ 4200 rpm

Y5A/Y5B
 Capacity: 
 Bore x Stroke: 
 Compression: 10.0:1
 Valvegear: Chain driven DOHC. 16 valves. Hydraulic tappets.
 Fuelling: EEC-V controlled multi-point fuel injection
 Power:  @ 5600 rpm
 Torque:  @ 4500 rpm.

Gallery

See also
 List of Ford engines

References

I
Gasoline engines by model
Straight-four engines